William Benjamin McLaren (8 March 1881 – 19 March 1962) was a Canadian sports shooter. He competed in the team clay pigeon event at the 1920 Summer Olympics. He won the Canadian trap shooting championship in 1915 and 1920, and eight times the trap shooting championship of Alberta. He had moved to Calgary, Alberta in 1906, and operated a hardware store there. He died in 1962.

References

External links
 

1881 births
1962 deaths
Canadian male sport shooters
Olympic shooters of Canada
Shooters at the 1920 Summer Olympics
Sportspeople from Ontario
20th-century Canadian people